The Doller is a river in Alsace (Haut-Rhin), in north-eastern France. It is a left tributary of the Ill (a tributary of the Rhine), in Mulhouse.

The source of the Doller is in the Vosges Mountains, east of the Ballon d'Alsace, at  elevation. It flows generally east, through the towns Sewen, Dolleren, Masevaux, Sentheim, Reiningue, before it enters the Ill in Mulhouse.

References

Doller
Rivers of Haut-Rhin
Rivers of Grand Est